This article contains information about the literary events and publications of 1803.

Events
June 30 – Novelist Mary Butt marries her cousin, Captain Henry Sherwood, acquiring the surname by which she will become best known.
September 9 – Bamberg State Library is established in Upper Franconia.
unknown date – The library which becomes the National Széchényi Library, established in 1802 by Count Ferenc Széchényi, opens to the public in Pest, Hungary.
Jane Austen completes Northanger Abbey

New books

Fiction
Charles Brockden Brown – Memoirs of Carwin the Biloquist
Sophie Ristaud Cottin – Amélie de Mansfield
Catherine Cuthbertson – The Romance of the Pyrenees
Elizabeth Gunning – The War-Office
Francis Lathom – The Mysterious Freebooter
Mary Meeke – A Tale of Mystery, or Celina
Jean Paul - Titan
Jane Porter – Thaddeus of Warsaw
Germaine de Staël – Margaret of Strafford

Drama
George Colman – John Bull
William Dunlap – Voice of Nature (adapted from the French)
Collin d'Harleville – Malice pour malice
Thomas Holcroft – Hear Both Sides
Heinrich von Kleist – Die Familie Schroffenstein
August von Kotzebue – Die deutschen Kleinstädter (comedy, German Small-towners)
Friedrich Schiller – The Bride of Messina (Die Braut von Messina), premiere in Weimar on March 19
Isaac Reed (ed.) – The Plays of William Shakspeare (first variorum edition)

Poetry
Henry Kirke White – Clifton Grove, a Sketch in Verse, with other Poems
Adam Oehlenschlager – Digte (Poems)

Non-fiction
Alexandre Balthazar Laurent Grimod de La Reynière – Almanach des gourmands (1st edition)
Immanuel Kant – Über Pädagogik (On Pedagogy)
Adamantios Korais – Present Conditions of Civilisation in Greece
Joseph Lancaster – Improvements in Education as It Respects the Industrious Classes
Thomas Malthus – An Essay on the Principle of Population (2nd edition)
Humphry Repton – Observations on the Theory and Practice of Landscape Gardening

Births
January 3 – Douglas William Jerrold, English dramatist (died 1857)
January 15 – Marjorie Fleming, Scottish child writer (died 1811)
January 27 – Eunice Hale Cobb, American writer, public speaker, and activist (died 1880)
May 16 – Amelie von Strussenfelt, Swedish novelist (died 1847)
May 25 
Edward Bulwer-Lytton, 1st Baron Lytton, English novelist, poet and dramatist (died 1873)
Ralph Waldo Emerson, American poet, essayist and philosopher (died 1882)
July 20 – Dudley Costello, Irish writer and journalist (died 1865)
September 20 – Catherine Crowe, English novelist, playwright and children's writer (died 1876)
September 28 – Prosper Mérimée, French dramatist and historian (died 1870)
October 25 – Maria Doolaeghe, Flemish novelist (died 1884)
November 14 – Jacob Abbott, American children's writer (died 1879)
December 6 – Susanna Moodie, English-born Canadian writer (died 1885)
December 31 – José María Heredia y Heredia, Cuban poet (died 1839)
Unknown date – Evan Bevan, Welsh writer of satirical verse (died 1866)

Deaths
January 1 – James Woodforde, English diarist (born 1740)
February 11 – Jean-François de La Harpe, French dramatist and critic (born 1739)
March 14 – Friedrich Gottlieb Klopstock, German poet (born 1724)
April 9 – Mihály Bakos (Miháo Bakoš), Slovene hymnist and Lutheran minister (born c. 1742)
June 12 – Richard François Philippe Brunck, French classical scholar (born 1729)
August 2 – John Hoole, English translator (born 1727)
September 5 – Pierre Choderlos de Laclos, French novelist (born 1841)
October 8 – Vittorio Alfieri, Italian dramatist and poet (born 1749)
December 18 – Johann Gottfried Herder, German philosopher, poet and critic (born 1744)

References

 
Years of the 19th century in literature